This article lists the museums in the Federated States of Micronesia:

Chuuk 

 Kimiuo Aisek Memorial Museum

Kosrae 

 Kosrae State Museum

Pohnpei 

 Lidorkini Museum in Kolonia, closed c.2012.

Yap 

 Yap Living History Museum, living museum of ethnography, co-financed by France in the town centre in Colonia.

References 

Society of the Federated States of Micronesia
Micronesia
Micronesia, Federated States of
Museums
Museums